Gangjeong is a hangwa (traditional Korean confection) made with glutinous rice flour. It is a deep-fried "rice puff" with hollow inside, coated with honey followed by nutty beans, nuts, seeds, pollen, or spice powders. Gangjeong is often served during important events such as weddings, ancestral rites, and Korean New Year celebrations. Yugwa was widely distributed after the Goryeo Dynasty due to the influence of Buddhism, and was called "Goryeo dessert" in the Yuan Dynasty of China.

Preparation 
Glutinous rice is soaked in water for four to five days, then pounded or ground into fine powder. Ten cups of glutinous rice flour is mixed with one-half cup cheongju (rice wine) and one-half cup honey, then steamed in a siru (steamer) lined with a wet bojagi (cloth). The well-dried gangjeong is first soaked in room-temperature cooking oil, then left to rise a little more in warm oil before it is deep-fried at a high temperature. When all excess oil is drained, the rice puff is coated with honey, followed by nutty grains or powders such as toasted sesame seeds, pine nut powder, soybean powder, pine pollen, Angelica leaf powder, and cinnamon powder.

See also 
 Yugwa
 Yeotgangjeong

Hangaone(Hangwa Culture Museum)

References 

Deep fried foods
Glutinous rice dishes
Hangwa